During the 2017–18 season, Cultural y Deportiva Leonesa are participating in the Spanish LaLiga 123, and the Copa del Rey.

Squad

Transfers 
List of Spanish football transfers summer 2017#Cultural Leonesa

In

Out

Competitions

Overall

Liga

League table

Matches 

Kickoff times are in CET.

Copa del Rey

References 

Cultural y Deportiva Leonesa seasons
Cultural y Deportiva Leonesa